Amos Adams (June 1880 - 1941) was a footballer who played in the Football League for West Bromwich Albion.

References

Association football defenders
English footballers
Sportspeople from West Bromwich
English Football League players
West Bromwich Albion F.C. players
1880 births
1941 deaths